Trnovac is a village in the municipality of Novi Travnik, Bosnia and Herzegovina.

Demographics 
According to the 2013 census, its population was nil, down from 92 (all Serbs) in 1991.

References

Populated places in Novi Travnik